The  is a weekly peer-reviewed medical journal published in French and aimed at the continuing medical education of medical practitioners and the francophone medical community in general.

History 

Abstracting and indexing 
The journal is abstracted and indexed in Index Medicus/MEDLINE/PubMed, Embase, EMCare, and Scopus.

See also 
 Swiss Medical Weekly

Notes and references

External links 
 

French-language journals
General medical journals
Weekly journals
Publications established in 2005